The 2018 NCAA Division I Cross Country Championships was the 80th annual NCAA Men's Division I Cross Country Championship and the 38th annual NCAA Women's Division I Cross Country Championship to determine the team and individual national champions of NCAA Division I men's and women's collegiate cross country running in the United States. In all, four different titles were contested: men's and women's individual and team championships.

Women's title
Distance: 6,000 meters
(DC) = Defending champions

Women's Team Result (Top 10)

Women's Individual Result (Top 10)

Men's title
Distance: 10,000 meters

Men's Team Result (Top 10)

Men's Individual Result (Top 10)

See also
 NCAA Men's Division II Cross Country Championship 
 NCAA Women's Division II Cross Country Championship 
 NCAA Men's Division III Cross Country Championship 
 NCAA Women's Division III Cross Country Championship

References
 

NCAA Cross Country Championships
NCAA Division I Cross Country Championships
NCAA Division I Cross Country Championships
Sports in Madison, Wisconsin
Track and field in Wisconsin
NCAA Division I Cross Country Championships